Arthur J. Whitcomb (April 20, 1886 – April 3, 1942) was an American farmer, lawyer and teacher.

Born, on a farm, near the community of Abrams, in the town of Abrams, Oconto County, Wisconsin, Whitcomb graduated from Oshkosh Normal School (now University of Wisconsin–Oshkosh). He taught at  Merrill High School in Merrill, Wisconsin and was a football coach. Whitcomb received his law degree from University of Wisconsin Law School and practiced law in Oconto, Wisconsin from 1916 to 1930. Whitcomb served in the Wisconsin State Assembly in 1915 and was a Republican. Whitcomb was counsel for the Wisconsin Electric Power Company, director of the Wisconsin Chamber of Commerce, and a member of the Wisconsin State Defense Council at the time of his death. Whitcomb died suddenly of a heart attack while staying at a hotel in Milwaukee, Wisconsin.

Notes

1886 births
1942 deaths
People from Abrams, Wisconsin
University of Wisconsin–Oshkosh alumni
University of Wisconsin–Madison alumni
University of Wisconsin Law School alumni
Educators from Wisconsin
Farmers from Wisconsin
Wisconsin lawyers
Republican Party members of the Wisconsin State Assembly
20th-century American politicians
20th-century American lawyers